Herbert Bramfeld (2 December 1912 – 1984) was a German modern pentathlete. He competed at the 1936 Summer Olympics.

References

1912 births
1984 deaths
German male modern pentathletes
Olympic modern pentathletes of Germany
Modern pentathletes at the 1936 Summer Olympics
Sportspeople from Hamburg